Utegenia is a genus of early tetrapod. It is usually regarded as a basal seymouriamorph, but sometimes included in the Discosauriscidae or as a sister taxon of the latter. Only one species, Utegenia shpinari, found from Kazakhstan, is known. Urumqia, another basal seymouriamorph, from Urumqi, Xinjiang of China is probably a junior synonym of Utegenia.

References

Seymouriamorphs
Permian tetrapods
Fossils of Kazakhstan